"Chapel of Love" is a song written by Jeff Barry, Ellie Greenwich and Phil Spector, and made famous by The Dixie Cups in 1964, spending three weeks at number one on the Billboard Hot 100. The song tells of the happiness and excitement the narrator feels on her wedding day, for she and her love are going to the "chapel of love", and "we'll never be lonely anymore." Many other artists have recorded the song.

It was originally recorded by Darlene Love in April 1963, but her version was not released until 1991. The Dixie Cups' version was the debut release of the new Red Bird Records run by Jerry Leiber and Mike Stoller along with George Goldner. The Ronettes included the song on their debut album released in November 1964 with production by Phil Spector. In 1973, singer and actress Bette Midler had a moderate hit with a cover of "Chapel of Love".

The Dixie Cups version

Background
The song was written in 1963 by Jeff Barry and Ellie Greenwich, who had themselves recently married; Barry later said that "the concept of marriage was very much in my head" at the time.   It was written for Darlene Love to record, but producer Phil Spector was dissatisfied with her version and it was not released for some years.

The Mel-Tones – a group of three young women from New Orleans, Barbara Ann Hawkins, Rosa Lee Hawkins, and Joan Marie Johnson – had traveled to New York City with their manager Joe Jones to attempt to get a record deal.  They were given the song "Chapel of Love" to sing, and passed an audition with Leiber and Stoller in the Brill Building.  The group rehearsed the song with Barry and Greenwich before recording it.  The arrangement was by Wardell Quezergue, and Leiber and Stoller added lyrics and some touches to the arrangements.   Leiber and Stoller then decided to issue the record as the first release on their own new record label, Red Bird, and changed the group's name to The Dixie Cups.

The definitive version of "Chapel of Love" by The Dixie Cups was released as a single in April 1964. Sung by Barbara Ann Hawkins, Rosa Lee Hawkins, and Joan Marie Johnson, this version was the group's first single taken from their debut studio album Chapel of Love. The song was arranged by Joe Jones and produced by Jerry Leiber, Mike Stoller, Ellie Greenwich, and Jeff Barry. It charted at number one on June 6, 1964 on the Billboard Hot 100 knocking The Beatles out of the number one spot and remained at the top for three weeks. The song also peaked at number 22 on the UK Singles Chart and hit number one in Canada on the RPM Chart. The "Chapel of Love" version by The Dixie Cups sold over one million copies, and was awarded a gold disc. The song was later included on the soundtrack to films ranging from Full Metal Jacket to Father of the Bride. The hit single recorded by The Dixie Cups was ranked No. 279 on Rolling Stones list of The 500 Greatest Songs of All Time, being the group's only song on the list. Billboard named the song No. 33 on their list of 100 Greatest Girl Group Songs of All Time.

Chart performance

Bette Midler version

Background
American singer and actress Bette Midler recorded a cover version of "Chapel of Love" for her 1972 debut studio album, The Divine Miss M. The track was produced and arranged by Barry Manilow. The following year, Midler included her version as the B-side of her number 40 pop single, "Friends" (the single charted on the Billboard Hot 100 as a double A-side).  The version included on the single release is a radically remixed version, with added horns and strings, and this version remained unreleased on any format other than the 45rpm until it was included as a bonus track on the 2016 remastered edition of The Divine Miss M. Midler's single of "Chapel of Love" was issued on Atlantic Records.

Chart performance

The Beach Boys version

Background
A cover by the American rock group, The Beach Boys was released on their 1976 album, 15 Big Ones.

Personnel

The Beach Boys
Al Jardine - backing vocals
Mike Love - backing vocals
Brian Wilson – lead vocals, backing vocals, ARP String Ensemble, piano, Moog bass
Carl Wilson – guitar
Dennis Wilson – drums

Additional musicians
Mike Altschol – saxophone
Steve Douglas – saxophone
Dennis Dreith – saxophone
Gene Estes – percussion
John J. Kelson Jr. – saxophone
Carol Lee Miller – autoharp
Jack Nimitz – saxophone

Other versions
The Blossoms were the first to record a version of the song in 1963 but it was never released as a single.
The Ronettes covered the song as the last track for their Philles debut studio album, Presenting the Fabulous Ronettes Featuring Veronica, released in November 1964 and produced by Phil Spector.
 In 1965 Venezuelan singer Mirla Castellanos released a version in Spanish of this song called "Vete con ella" ("Go with her"), which appeared on her album Imprevú. Notice that here the song uses the music of the original version but lyrics were changed, talking about missed love. This version was also released, in 1965, by the Spanish singer Mayté Gaos in Mexico (where she was living at that time) and, in 1988, the Mexican pop singer Lucero recorded this same version for her fifth studio album Lucerito.
 In 1972, Jamaican reggae-artist Lorna Bennet released her own version which also appeared on the compilation LP "Trojan Sisters", issued that same year by Trojan Records.
 A punk version was released in December 1979 by Holly and the Italians as the B-side of their debut "Tell That Girl to Shut Up" single on Oval Records.
 The song was covered by Elton John for the soundtrack of Four Weddings and a Funeral in 1994.

References

1964 debut singles
Songs written by Ellie Greenwich
Songs written by Jeff Barry
Songs written by Phil Spector
Billboard Hot 100 number-one singles
Cashbox number-one singles
Song recordings produced by Phil Spector
The Dixie Cups songs
The Beach Boys songs
Bette Midler songs
RPM Top Singles number-one singles
1964 songs
Songs about marriage
Red Bird Records singles
The Ronettes songs